The list of ship commissionings in 1807 includes a chronological list of ships commissioned in 1807.  In cases where no official commissioning ceremony was held, the date of service entry may be used instead.


References

See also 

1807
 Ship decommissionings
 Ship launches
Ship launches